The 2001 Carolina Panthers season was the franchise's 7th season in the National Football League (NFL) and the 3rd and final under head coach George Seifert. They tried to improve upon their 7–9 record in 2000, and make it to the playoffs for the second time in franchise history; however, the season was a wreck. Not only were the Panthers unable to improve over their previous season, but they deteriorated even further, dropping to 1–15.

The Panthers defeated the Minnesota Vikings in their opening game of the season, and then became the first team in the Super Bowl era to lose fifteen consecutive games afterwards. The Panthers were the only team to have won their opener and lose the remainder of the season until the 2020 Jacksonville Jaguars became the second team to accomplish this feat.

The Panthers consequently beat the record for most consecutive losses during a single NFL season that had been shared by the 1976 Tampa Bay Buccaneers, 1980 New Orleans Saints, 1981 Baltimore Colts and 1990 New England Patriots. This record has since been broken by two winless teams: the 2008 Detroit Lions and 2017 Cleveland Browns.  The 2001 Panthers also became the seventh team to finish 1–15 .

By the end of the season, the Panthers had become so incapacitated that only about 16,000 fans showed up to see them play in their finale against the New England Patriots, who eventually went on to win Super Bowl XXXVI. Coincidentally, the Panthers would face the Patriots two seasons later in Super Bowl XXXVIII. Following their terrible season, head coach George Seifert was fired and replaced by New York Giants defensive coordinator John Fox.

Despite having the worst record in the league, the Panthers did not earn a number-one overall draft pick in the 2002 NFL Draft due to the debut season of the expansion Houston Texans.

14 years later, the Panthers went 15–1 and made it to Super Bowl 50, becoming the first team in NFL history to have both a 1–15 season and a 15–1 season. With the NFL expanding to a 17-game schedule in the 2021 season, they are also the only team to accomplish this.

Offseason

NFL Draft

Undrafted free agents

Personnel

Staff

Roster

Regular season

Schedule

Game summaries

Week 1: at Minnesota Vikings

This would be Carolina's only victory of the 2001 season. The Panthers would not win again until week 1 of the 2002 season.

Week 2: at Atlanta Falcons

Week 3: vs. Green Bay Packers

Week 4: at San Francisco 49ers

Week 5: vs. New Orleans Saints

Week 6: at Washington Redskins

Week 7: vs. New York Jets

Both offenses struggled throughout the game as the Jets gained 358 yards of total offense, but turned the ball over four times; conversely, the Panthers only had one turnover, but only gained 162 yards of total offense. Carolina scored first, with Rashard Anderson recovering a fumble and returning it 94 yards for a touchdown, but John Kasay missed the extra point. New York would respond late in the second quarter, with Chris Hayes returning a blocked punt 7 yards for a touchdown. The Panthers would score six unanswered points with a pair of 45-yard field goals from Kasay to go up 12–7 early in the third. However, Kasay's missed extra point would prove to be costly as the Jets would respond with two field goals of their own to win 13–12.

Week 8: at Miami Dolphins

Week 9: at St. Louis Rams

Week 10: vs. San Francisco 49ers

Week 11: vs. Atlanta Falcons

Week 12: at New Orleans Saints

Week 13: at Buffalo Bills

Week 15: vs. St. Louis Rams

Week 16: vs. Arizona Cardinals

Week 17: vs. New England Patriots

With the loss, the Panthers lost their 15th game in a row and finished the season at 1–15. The Panthers finished with the worst record in the NFL, but only received the second overall pick in the 2002 NFL Draft due to the first overall pick being awarded to the Houston Texans, an expansion team. This would be the last game the Panthers played as a member of the NFC West as they were moved to the newly formed NFC South starting next season. Carolina was joined by New Orleans, Atlanta (both also coming from the NFC West), and Tampa Bay (from the NFC Central, which was renamed to the NFC North).

Head coach George Seifert would be fired the following day, finishing his tenure at Carolina with a record of 16–32 and zero playoff appearances.

Standings

References

Carolina Panthers seasons
Carolina Panthers
Carolina